Behrang 2020 (Jawi: بيهراڠ 2020) or Bandar Behrang 2020 is a townships in Perak, Malaysia. It is located between Behrang and Tanjung Malim. The number 2020 stands for the year of Wawasan 2020 vision.

Populated places in Perak